Margarete Neumann (19 February 1917 – 4 March 2002) was a German writer and lyrical poet.

Life
Margarete Neumann was born in Pyritz, Pomerania, German Empire.  She studied at the social educational seminar in Königsberg and worked until 1945 as a welfare worker in Heilsberg.  After being expelled from Poland to Germany in 1945, she was a farmer in Mecklenburg and a welder in Halle (Saale).  Since 1952 she lived as a freelance writer in Hohen Neuendorf then in Neubrandenburg after 1961.  She was allowed as a partisanship writer and advocate of socialist realism in East Germany.

After the Wende, Neumann lived in Sousse, Tunisia from 1991 to 2001. She succumbed to cancer on 4 March 2002 in Rostock.  The grave of the author is found in Mallin.

Works
 Der Weg über den Acker (The road across the field), Novel, 1955
 Lene Bastians Geschichte (Lene Bastian's History), Novellas, 1956
 Der lange Weg (The Long Way), Narrative, 1958
 Brot auf hölzerner Schale (Bread from the Wooden Bowl), Poems, 1959
 Elisabeth, Narrative, 1960
 Rumpelstilzchen, Radio play, 1960
 Das Aprikosenbäumchen (The Little Apricot Tree), Children's Book, 1960
 Der Wunderbaum (The Wonder Tree), Children's Book, 1960
 Der Spiegel (The Mirror), Narrative, 1962
 Der Totengräber (The Dead Graves), Novel, 1963
 ... und sie liebten sich doch (.. and they loved themselves nevertheless), Novel, 1966
 Die Liebenden (The Beloved), Novel, 1970
 Der grüne Salon (The Green Salon), Novel, 1972
 Magda Adomeit, Novel, 1985
 Land der grüngoldenen Berge: Unterwegs in Mongolien, Novel, 1986
 Dies ist mein Leben ... (This is my Life ...), Narrative cycle, 1987
 Nach einem sehr langen Winter (After a very long Winter). Selected Stories 1956–1987, Aufbau Verlag 1989
 Der Geistkämpfer. 2 Novellen um Barlach (The Ghost Fighter. 2 Novellas about Barlach), Aufbau Verlag 1990
 Da Abend und Morgen einander berühren Die Webers und die Adomeits (The Webers and the Adomeits affect each other that evening and morning). Novel, Aufbau Verlag 1990

Prizes
 1957 Heinrich Mann Prize
 1962 Fritz Reuter Prize

External links
Literature by and on Margarete Neumann in the catalog of the German National Library 
Literature about Margarete Neumann in the Landesbibliographie Mecklenburg-Vorpommern 

1917 births
2002 deaths
People from Pyrzyce
People from the Province of Pomerania
Heinrich Mann Prize winners
German women poets
20th-century German poets
20th-century German women writers
German expatriates in Tunisia